Ben Moon may refer to:

Ben Moon (rock climber) (born 1966), British rock climber and business man
Ben Moon (rugby union) (born 1989), English prop

See also
Moon (disambiguation)